The 2010 Franken Challenge was a professional tennis tournament played on outdoor red clay courts. It was part of the 2010 ATP Challenger Tour. It took place in Fürth, Germany between 30 May – 6 June 2010.

Singles main draw entrants

Seeds

 Rankings are as of May 24, 2010.

Other entrants
The following players received wildcards into the singles main draw:
  Matthias Bachinger
  Florian Mayer
  Cedrik-Marcel Stebe
  Marcel Zimmermann

The following player received entry into the main draw as alternate:
  Marius Copil
  Konstantin Kravchuk
  Pablo Santos
  Joseph Sirianni
  Gabriel Trujillo Soler

The following players received entry from the qualifying draw:
  Dennis Blömke
  Rameez Junaid
  Jan-Lennard Struff
  Matteo Viola

The following player received the lucky loser spot:
  Marc Sieber

Champions

Singles

 Robin Haase def.  Tobias Kamke, 6–4, 6–2

Doubles

 Dustin Brown /  Rameez Junaid def.  Martin Emmrich /  Joseph Sirianni, 6–3, 6–1

References
Official website
ITF search 
2010 Draws

Franken Challenge
Franken Challenge
Franken Challenge
Franken Challenge
Franken Challenge